SCHEMBL5334361 is a drug which acts as an agonist at the 5-HT2 family of serotonin receptors, and was developed for the treatment of glaucoma. It is a benzazepine derivative structurally related to the anorectic drug lorcaserin. It is selective for 5-HT2A, with an EC50 of 0.4nM at 5-HT2A vs 3.9nM at 5-HT2C and a much lower affinity of 417nM at 5-HT2B.

See also 
 3C-BZ
 AAZ-A-154
 AL-34662
 GSK-189254
 IHCH-7113
 O-4310

References 

Serotonin receptor agonists
Benzazepines
O-methylated phenols